The women's alpine skiing giant slalom event was part of the alpine skiing at the 1952 Winter Olympics programme. It was the first appearance of the event at the Olympics. The competition was held on Thursday, 14 February 1952 at Norefjell ski area and started at 1 p.m. Forty-five alpine skiers from 15 nations competed.

Results
Thursday, 14 February 1952

References

External links
Official Olympic Report
 

Women's alpine skiing at the 1952 Winter Olympics
Oly
Alp